Jahan Waltè Dotson (born March 22, 2000) is an American football wide receiver for the Washington Commanders of the National Football League (NFL). He played college football at Penn State and was drafted by the Commanders in the first round of the 2022 NFL Draft.

Early years
Dotson was born on March 22, 2000, in Newark, New Jersey. He attended Nazareth Area High School in Nazareth, Pennsylvania in the Lehigh Valley region of eastern Pennsylvania. He left for Peddie School in Hightstown, New Jersey for his junior year but then returned to Nazareth High School for his senior year in 2017. He set school records at Nazareth for most receptions (187), most receiving yards (2,755), and most touchdowns (40).

Dotson originally committed to play college football at UCLA but later rescinded his UCLA commitment to play for Penn State.

College career
Dotson appeared in eight games for the Penn State Nittany Lions as a freshman in 2018 and made four starts, recording 13 receptions for 203 yards. As a sophomore in 2019, he started all 13 games and had 27 receptions for 488 yards and five touchdowns.

Dotson became Penn State's leading receiver as a junior in 2020. Against the Ohio State Buckeyes, Dotson recorded eight catches for 144 yards and three touchdowns. Against Michigan State, Dotson became the third Big Ten player since 2000 to have a punt return touchdown and 100 receiving yards in the same game. Dotson finished the 2020 season with 884 receiving yards and eight touchdowns, and was named third-team All-Big Ten.

In 2021, Dotson recorded 11 receptions for 242 yards and 3 touchdowns in Penn State's win over Maryland, breaking Deon Butler's school record for receiving yards in a game. In December 2021, announced his intention to enter the 2022 NFL Draft following the season. He graduated from Penn State with a degree in telecommunications in May 2022. Dotson finished his Penn State career second in school history in both career (183) and single-season (91 in 2021) receptions, fourth in career receiving yards (2,757), second in single-season receiving yards (1,182 in 2021), and second in both career (25) and single-season (12 in 2021) touchdowns.

Professional career

Dotson was selected by the Washington Commanders in the first round of the 2022 NFL Draft with the 16th overall selection. The team originally had the 11th selection before trading down and picking up third and fourth round picks later in the draft. Dotson signed his four-year rookie contract, worth $15 million, on May 18, 2022. He was named the Pepsi NFL Rookie of the Week in his debut with the Commanders after catching three passes for 40 yards and two touchdowns in a Week 1 victory over the Jacksonville Jaguars. In Week 4, Dotson suffered a hamstring injury in a loss to the Dallas Cowboys. The injury sidelined him for five games, and he made his return in Week 10 against the Philadelphia Eagles. He won the award a second time in Week 15 after catching four passes for 105 yards and a touchdown against the New York Giants. Dotson finished the season with 31 receptions for 523 yards and seven touchdowns.

References

External links

 
 Washington Commanders bio
 Penn State Nittany Lions bio

2000 births
Living people
African-American players of American football
American football wide receivers
Nazareth Area High School alumni
Peddie School alumni
Penn State Nittany Lions football players
People from Nazareth, Pennsylvania
Players of American football from Newark, New Jersey
Sportspeople from Northampton County, Pennsylvania
Washington Commanders players